The Busan Metropolitan Council is the local council of Busan, South Korea.

There is a total of 47 members, with 42 members elected in the First-past-the-post voting system and 5 members elected in Party-list proportional representation.

Current composition 

Negotiation groups can be formed by five or more members. There are currently two negotiation groups in the council, formed by the Democratic Party of Korea and the Liberty Korea Party.

Organization 
The structure of Council consists of:
Chairman
Two Vice Chairmen
Standing Committees
Steering Committee
Plannung and Administration Committee
Economy and Culture Committee
Welfare and Environmental Committee
Maritime Affairs and Transportation Committee
Urban Safety Committee
Education Committee
Special Committee
Special Committee on Buddet & Accounts
Special Committee on Ethics
Special Committee on Decentralization
Special Committee on Local Economy
Council Secretariat
Secretary General
General Affairs Division
General Affairs
Management
Proceedings Division
Proceedings
Bill Records
Public Relations Division
Public Relations
News
Legislative Policy Division
Legislations
Policy Research
Expert Commissioners
Steering Committee
Plannung and Administration Committee
Economy and Culture Committee
Welfare and Environmental Committee
Maritime Affairs and Transportation Committee
Urban Safety Committee
Education Committee

Recent election results

2018 

|- style="text-align:center;"
! rowspan="2" colspan="3" width="200" | Party
! colspan="4" | Constituency
! colspan="4" | Party list
! colspan="2" | Total seats
|- style="text-align:center;"
! width="70" | Votes
! width="40" | %
! width="40" | Seats
! width="32" | ±
! width="70" | Votes
! width="40" | %
! width="40" | Seats
! width="32" | ±
! width="40" | Seats
! width="32" | ±
|-
| width="1" style="background-color:" |
| style="text-align:left;" colspan=2| Democratic Party of Korea
| 889,481 || 53.02 || 38 || 38
| 825,832 || 48.81 || 3 || 1
| 41 || 39
|-
| width="1" style="background-color:" |
| style="text-align:left;" colspan=2| Liberty Korea Party
| 690,812 || 41.17 || 4 || 38
| 621,446 || 36.73 || 2 || 1
| 6 || 39
|-
| width="1" style="background-color:" |
| style="text-align:left;" colspan=2| Bareunmirae Party
| 54,744 || 3.26 || 0 || new
| 113,881 || 6.73 || 0 || new
| 0 || new
|-
| width="1" style="background-color:" |
| style="text-align:left;" colspan=2| Justice Party
| 2,085 || 0.12 || 0 || 0
| 92,157 || 5.44 || 0 || 0
| 0 || 0
|-
| width="1" style="background-color:" |
| style="text-align:left;" colspan=2| Green Party Korea
| colspan=4 
| 11,915 || 0.70 || 0 || 0
| 0 || 0
|-
| width="1" style="background-color:" |
| style="text-align:left;" colspan=2| Minjung Party
| 8,831 || 0.53 || 0 || new
| 11,833 || 0.69 || 0 || new
| 0 || new
|-
| width="1" style="background-color:" |
| style="text-align:left;" colspan=2| Korean Patriots' Party
| colspan=4 
| 7,523 || 0.44 || 0 || new
| 0 || new
|-
| width="1" style="background-color:" |
| style="text-align:left;" colspan=2| Party for Democracy and Peace
| colspan=4 
| 7,289 || 0.43 || 0 || new
| 0 || new
|-
| width="1" style="background-color:grey" |
| style="text-align:left;" colspan=2| Other parties
| 612 || 0.04 || 0 || 0
| colspan=4 
| 0 || 0
|-
| width="1" style="background-color:" |
| style="text-align:left;" colspan=2| Independents
| 31,224 || 1.86 || 0 || 0
| colspan=4 
| 0 || 0
|-
|- style="background-color:#E9E9E9"
| colspan=3 style="text-align:center;" | Total
| 1,677,789 || 100.00 || 42 || –
| 1,691,876 || 100.00 || 5 || –
| 47 || –
|}

References 

Busan
Provincial councils of South Korea